Division No. 12 is one of the eighteen census divisions in the province of Saskatchewan, Canada, as defined by Statistics Canada. It is located in the west-central part of the province. The most populous community in this division is Battleford.

Demographics 

Census subdivisions 
The following census subdivisions (municipalities or municipal equivalents) are located within Saskatchewan's Division No. 12.

Cities
none

Towns
Battleford
Biggar
Delisle
Rosetown
Zealandia

Villages

Asquith
Conquest
Dinsmore
Harris
Kinley
Macrorie
Milden
Perdue
Tessier
Vanscoy
Wiseton

Rural municipalities

 RM No. 285 Fertile Valley
 RM No. 286 Milden
 RM No. 287 St. Andrews
 RM No. 288 Pleasant Valley
 RM No. 315 Montrose
 RM No. 316 Harris
 RM No. 317 Marriott
 RM No. 318 Mountain View
 RM No. 345 Vanscoy
 RM No. 346 Perdue
 RM No. 347 Biggar
 RM No. 376 Eagle Creek
 RM No. 377 Glenside
 RM No. 378 Rosemount
 RM No. 408 Prairie
 RM No. 438 Battle River

Indian reserves
 Grizzly Bear's Head 110 and Lean Man 111
 Mosquito 109
 Red Pheasant 108
 Sweet Grass 113
 Sweet Grass 113-M16

See also 
List of census divisions of Saskatchewan
List of communities in Saskatchewan

References

Division No. 12, Saskatchewan Statistics Canada

 
12